The Dartmouth Big Green men's ice hockey statistical leaders are individual statistical leaders of the Dartmouth Big Green men's ice hockey program in various categories, including goals, assists, points, and saves. Within those areas, the lists identify single-game, single-season, and career leaders. The Big Green represent Dartmouth College in the NCAA's ECAC Hockey.

Dartmouth began competing in intercollegiate ice hockey in 1905.  These lists are updated through the end of the 2021–22 season.

Goals

Assists

Points

Saves

References

Lists of college ice hockey statistical leaders by team
Statistical